Lomandra collina is a perennial, rhizomatous herb found in Australia.

References

collina
Asparagales of Australia
Flora of New South Wales
Flora of South Australia
Flora of Victoria (Australia)
Flora of Western Australia